Francis Henry Tuck (24 July 1931 – 1 July 2016) was an Australian rules footballer, who played in the Victorian Football League (VFL). He was a member of the famous Collingwood half-back line of Lucas, Kingston, and Tuck.

After VFL football, he was captain-coach of Corowa Football Club in the Ovens and Murray Football League from 1960 to 1964, and then he bought a butcher business in Birchip, Victoria.

Tuck died on 1 July 2016 aged 84.

External links

References

1931 births
2016 deaths
Australian rules footballers from Victoria (Australia)
Collingwood Football Club players
Corowa Football Club players
Corowa Football Club coaches